The 1986 Big East baseball tournament was held at Muzzy Field in Bristol, Connecticut. This was the second annual Big East baseball tournament. The  won their second consecutive tournament. As a result, St. John's earned the Big East Conference's automatic bid to the 1986 NCAA Division I baseball tournament.

Format and seeding 
The 1986 Big East baseball tournament was a 4 team double elimination tournament, the same as the previous year. The top two teams from each division, based on conference winning percentage, earned berths in the field. Each division winner faced the runner up from the opposite division in the first round. Providence claimed the top seed from the North by defeating St. John's in the regular season series.

Tournament

All-Tournament Team 
The following players were named to the All-Tournament team.

Jack Kaiser Award 
Tom Finke was the winner of the 1986 Jack Kaiser Award. Finke was a left fielder for St. John's.

References 

Tournament
Big East Conference Baseball Tournament
Big East Conference baseball tournament
Big East Conference baseball tournament
College baseball tournaments in Connecticut
Bristol, Connecticut
Sports competitions in Hartford County, Connecticut